Amanita suballiacea is a species of Amanita found in  US coast of the Gulf of Mexico occurring with Quercus and Pinus.

References

External links

suballiacea
Fungi of North America